The Criminal Justice and Public Order Act 1994 (c.33) is an Act of the Parliament of the United Kingdom. It introduced a number of changes to the law, most notably in the restriction and reduction of existing rights, clamping down on unlicensed rave parties, and greater penalties for certain "anti-social" behaviours. The Bill was introduced by Michael Howard, Home Secretary of Prime Minister John Major's Conservative government, and attracted widespread opposition.

Background
A primary motivation for the act was to curb illegal raves and free parties, especially the traveller festival circuit, which was steadily growing in the early 1990s, culminating in the 1992 Castlemorton Common Festival. Following debates in the House of Commons in its aftermath, Prime Minister John Major alluded to a future clampdown with then Home Secretary Ken Clarke at that year's Conservative Party conference. At the 1993 conference, Michael Howard, who had become Home Secretary, announced details of the new Criminal Justice Bill.

Despite protests and discord against the bill, the opposition Labour Party took an official line to abstain at the third reading, and the Act passed into law on 3 November 1994.

Key measures
Key measures of the act that received public attention included:

 Part III, sections 34–39 which substantially changed the right to silence of an accused person, allowing for inferences to be drawn from their silence.
 Part IV, sections 54–59 which gave the police greater rights to take and retain intimate body samples.
 Part IV, section 60 which increased police powers of unsupervised stop and search.
 The whole of Part V covered collective trespass and nuisance on land and included sections against raves and further sections against disruptive trespass, squatters, and unauthorised campers – most significantly the criminalisation of previously civil offences. This affected many forms of protest including hunt sabotage and anti-road protests. Sections 63–67 in particular defined any gathering of 20 or more people where:
 Part V, section 80 which repealed the duty imposed on councils by the Caravan Sites Act 1968 to provide sites for gypsy and traveller use. Grant aid for the provision of sites was also withdrawn.
 Part VII, which handled "Obscenity and Pornography", banning simulated child pornography, harshening provisions dealing with the censorship and age restriction of videos (as administered by the British Board of Film Classification BBFC), and also increasing the penalty on obscene phone calls.
 Part XI, which dealt with sexual offences. The definition of rape was extended to include anal rape, previously prosecuted as buggery. This offence was disestablished, as Section 143 - though not given much consideration - legalised anal sex between heterosexual couples, which had been legal between homosexual couples (over the age of 21) since 1967. The age at which homosexual acts were lawful was reduced from 21 years to 18.  During the passage of the Bill, MPs considered an amendment to reduce this age to 16 (thereby equating it with the age of consent for heterosexual sex) but the motion was rejected by 27 votes.  Analysis of the division list revealed that 42 Conservative MPs had supported equalisation, and the motion would have carried but for the opposing votes of 38 Labour MPs.
 Part XII, which was a miscellany, and included the notice that the "Offence of racially inflammatory publication etc. (was henceforth) to be arrestable", although this was later to be modified by the Serious Organised Crime and Police Act 2005.  Part XII also criminalised the use of cells from embryos and foetuses.

Opposition and protest

Whilst the legislation was still under debate, the groups Advance Party and Freedom Network coordinated a campaign of resistance. The group was composed of an alliance of sound systems and civil liberties groups. A movement against the bill grew across "the overlapping squatting, road protest and free party scenes".

Three demonstrations were organised in London throughout 1994. The first of these took place on 1 May (May Day), with an estimated 20,000 people taking part in a march starting at Hyde Park and finishing at Trafalgar Square. The second, on 24 July, followed the same route with numbers estimated between 20,000 and 50,000. The larger turnout was partly attributed to a mobilisation from the Socialist Workers Party and with them placards reading "Kill the Bill", but it also created a degree of "political tension" with the other founding groups.

The third demonstration was called on 9 October, with police estimating 20,000 to 30,000 people attending, while organisers put the figure at over 100,000. The day ended in a riot in Hyde Park that continued into the evening. Accounts stated that, around 5pm, a confrontation occurred between protesters and police when protesters attempted to bring two sound systems into the park. With such a large number of protesters, the police were overpowered and backed off. Riot and mounted police reinforcements arrived shortly afterwards, and reportedly charged at protesters in an attempt to disperse the estimated 1,500-person crowd.

The civil liberties group Liberty opposed many of the measures proposed by the act at the time, regarding them as "wrong in principle and likely to violate the European Convention on Human Rights".

Criticism
Jon Savage, author of books on youth culture, said of the legislation in Bill form, "It's about politicians making laws on the basis of judging people's lifestyles, and that's no way to make laws". George Monbiot described it as "crude, ill-drafted and repressive". The Act was described by Professor of Cultural Studies Jeremy Gilbert as a "piece of legislation which was "explicitly aimed at suppressing the activities of certain strands of alternative culture", the main targets being squatting, direct action, football fan culture, hunt sabotage and the free party. 

The sections which specifically refer to parties or raves were, according to Professor of Sociology Nigel South, "badly defined and drafted" in an atmosphere of moral panic following the Castlemorton Common Festival. The law's attempt to define music in terms of "repetitive beats" was described as "bizarre" by Professor of Law Robert Lee. 

Reflecting on the time, the journalist Ally Fogg wrote in The Guardian:

Response from musicians 
The British IDM band Autechre released the three-track Anti EP in support of the advocacy group Liberty. The EP contained "Flutter", a song composed to contravene the definition of music in the Act as "repetitive beats" by using 65 distinctive drum patterns. The EP bore a warning advising DJs to "have a lawyer and a musicologist present at all times to confirm the non-repetitive nature of the music in the event of police harassment".

The fifth mix on the Internal version of Orbital's Are We Here? EP was titled "Criminal Justice Bill?". It consisted of approximately four minutes of silence. In their 1995 track Sad But New, Orbital  incorporated samples from John Major's 1992 conference speech.

"Their Law", a song by electronic dance acts the Prodigy and Pop Will Eat Itself, was written as a direct response to the bill. A quotation in the booklet of the Prodigy's 1994 album Music for the Jilted Generation read "How can the government stop young people having a good time? Fight this bollocks." The album featured a drawing commissioned by the band from Les Edwards depicting a young male rebel figure protecting a rave from an impending attack of riot police.

In 1993, the band Dreadzone released a single, "Fight the Power", in opposition to the proposed Criminal Justice Bill, featuring samples from Noam Chomsky discussing taking action and "taking control of your lives", advocating political resistance to the proposed bill. The track also features on a 1994 compilation Taking Liberties, released to raise funds to fight the bill. The B-side to Zion Train's 1995 "Dance of Life" single included a track entitled "Resist the Criminal Justice Act".

The Six6 Records compilation album NRB:58 No Repetitive Beats (1994) was released in opposition to the proposed Bill. The album's liner notes said:

See also

 Public Order Act
 Law of the United Kingdom
 Riot Act
 Stop and Search
 Civil liberties
 Direct action

References

External links
 Text of the Criminal Justice and Public Order Act 1994 as originally enacted, on Legislation.gov.uk
 The Criminal Justice and Public Order Act 1994 as in force today, on Legislation.gov.uk
 Criminal Justice Act 1994 online guide (archived) on Urban75

United Kingdom Acts of Parliament 1994
Criminal law of the United Kingdom
LGBT law in the United Kingdom
Squatting in the United Kingdom
Rave culture in the United Kingdom
Protests in the United Kingdom
Anti-protest law